Chato or Challo is a village in Sissala East Municipal District, Upper West Region of Ghana, West Africa.

Notes

Populated places in Sissala East Municipal District